Hoplomyzon cardosoi, is a species of fish from the genus Hoplomyzon. The species was originally described by Tiago P. Carvalho, Roberto E. Reis and John P. Friel in 2017

Description 
Hoplomyzon cardosoi  is a miniature species of banjo catfish from Lake Maracaibo in Venezuela. The have a length between 1.5 and 1.9 mm

Distribution and habitat
Hoplomyzon cardosoi is endemic to the Maracaibo Basin in the Zulia State in Venezuela

Etymology
Hoplomyzon cardosoi is named after Alexandre Rodrigues Cardoso

References

Aspredinidae
Taxa named by Roberto Esser dos Reis